Women's golf has a set of major championships which parallels that in men's golf, with the women's system newer and less stable than the men's. As of 2013, five tournaments are designated as majors in women's golf by the LPGA Tour.

LPGA majors

Current position
The LPGA's list of majors has changed several times over the years. Other than name changes, the two most recent changes were:
 In 2001, the du Maurier Classic, held in Canada, lost its primary sponsorship after that country passed severe restrictions on tobacco advertising. The tournament, now known as the Canadian Women's Open, is still a regular event on the LPGA Tour, but no longer designated as a major. The LPGA elevated the Women's British Open to major status to replace the du Maurier Classic.
 In 2013, The Evian Championship, held in France, became the fifth LPGA major. Known before 2013 as the Evian Masters, it is one of two events recognized as majors by the LPGA's European counterpart, the Ladies European Tour (LET). The elevation of this event to LPGA major status and the name change were announced by the LPGA on July 20, 2011.

As of 2022, the order in which women's majors are played:

The Chevron Championship
U.S. Women's Open
Women's PGA Championship
The Evian Championship
The Women's Open

Before The Evian Championship became the fifth LPGA major, the setup of women's majors closely paralleled that of the mainstream (i.e., under-50) men's majors. In both cases, the United States hosts three majors and the United Kingdom one. The Evian Championship, as noted above, is held in France. The U.S. Open and The Open, and the PGA Championship match their male equivalents. The Chevron Championship is the first major of the season and through 2022 has been held at a single host course (the Mission Hills Country Club), similarly to the Masters Tournament, although this is set to change in 2023.

Unlike the mainstream men's equivalents, all but one of the women's majors have title sponsors. Each of the five majors falls under a different jurisdiction. The LPGA organizes the Chevron Championship. Through 2014, it also organized the LPGA Championship, but since 2015 that tournament has been taken over by the PGA of America, the body that organizes the men's PGA Championship, and has been renamed the Women's PGA Championship. The U.S. Women's Open,  is operated by the United States Golf Association. The Women's Open is operated by The R&A since a 2016 merger with the Ladies Golf Union. The Evian Championship is operated by the Ladies European Tour.

From 2006 through 2008, the winners of the four women's majors received automatic entry to the LPGA's season championship, the LPGA Tour Championship. Beginning in 2009, the Tour Championship extended entry to all players in the top 120 on the official LPGA Money List. Starting in 2011, the Tour Championship was replaced by the CME Group Titleholders; from that point through 2013, the top three finishers at all official tour events, including the majors, who had not already qualified for the Titleholders earned entries. Starting in 2014, the LPGA adopted a points race similar in some ways to the PGA Tour's FedEx Cup. In the new system, officially called the "Race to the CME Globe", the top 72 points earners during the season, plus all tournament winners, qualify for the renamed final event, the CME Group Tour Championship, in which the top nine points earners will have at least a mathematical chance of winning the season title.

History
Eight different events are classified as having been LPGA majors at some time. The number in each season has fluctuated between two and five. The first tournament which is now included in the LPGA's official list of major victories is the 1930 Women's Western Open, although this is a retrospective designation as the LPGA was not founded until 1950.·The Titleholders was played from 1937 to 1966 with a gap due to World War II. In 1967 there were three majors, then from 1968 to 1971 this decreased and went back to two majors. Then in 1979, the du Maurier Classic was first played and immediately considered a major leading to three majors again from 1979 to 1982. In 1983, when Nabisco Dinah Shore gained major championship status, there were four majors.

Women's Western Open: 1930–1967
Titleholders Championship: 1937–1942, 1946–1966, 1972
U.S. Women's Open: 1946–present
Women's PGA Championship: 1955–present (LPGA Championship, 1955–2014)
du Maurier Classic: 1979–2000 (Peter Jackson Classic, 1979–1983)
The Chevron Championship: 1983–present (Nabisco Dinah Shore, 1983–1999; Nabisco Championship, 2000–2001; Kraft Nabisco Championship, 2002–2014, ANA Inspiration, 2015–2021)
The Women's Open: 2001–present
The Evian Championship: 2013–present

LPGA major winners

The "Grand Slam"
No woman has completed a four-major Grand Slam, much less one with five majors. Babe Zaharias won all three majors contested in 1950 and Sandra Haynie won both majors in 1974.

During the four-major era, six women have completed a "Career Grand Slam" by winning four different majors . There are variations in the set of four tournaments involved as the players played in different eras. The six are: Pat Bradley; Juli Inkster; Annika Sörenstam; Louise Suggs; Karrie Webb; and Mickey Wright. During the five-major era, Inbee Park became the first woman to complete the "Career Grand Slam." Even though there has been some debate surrounding whether Park has actually accomplished this feat, as she won The Evian Championship in 2012 before it officially  became a major in 2013, LPGA acknowledged Park to have successfully achieved a "Career Grand Slam."
The LPGA recognizes Webb as its only "Super Career Grand Slam" winner, since she is the only golfer to have won five events recognized by the LPGA as majors. Before the elevation of The Evian Championship to major status, the following was required for a golfer to win the Super Career Grand Slam:
 The du Maurier Classic between 1979 and 2000, when it was recognized by the LPGA as a major;
 the Women's British Open in 2001 or later; and
 the other three then-existing majors.
Webb won the du Maurier Classic in 1999 and the Women's British Open in 2002.

Major champions by nationality
The table below shows the number of major championships won by golfers from various countries.

Consecutive victories at a major championship

Multiple major victories in a calendar year

Three victories
1950:  Babe Zaharias; Women's Western Open, U.S. Women's Open, and Titleholders Championship
1961:  Mickey Wright; LPGA Championship, U.S. Women's Open, and Titleholders Championship
1986:  Pat Bradley; Kraft Nabisco Championship, LPGA Championship, du Maurier Classic	
2013:  Inbee Park; Kraft Nabisco Championship, LPGA Championship, U.S. Women's Open
Note: These golfers are also included below in the Two victories section.

Two victories

ANA Inspiration and LPGA Championship 
1986:  Pat Bradley
2005:  Annika Sörenstam
2013:  Inbee Park

ANA Inspiration and The Evian Championship 
2019:  Ko Jin-young

ANA Inspiration and U.S. Women's Open 
1990:  Betsy King
2000:  Karrie Webb
2013:  Inbee Park

ANA Inspiration and Women's British Open 
 2010:  Yani Tseng

LPGA Championship and U.S. Women's Open 
1958:  Mickey Wright
1961:  Mickey Wright (2)
1974:  Sandra Haynie
1991:  Meg Mallon
1998:  Se Ri Pak
1999:  Juli Inkster
2001:  Karrie Webb
2013:  Inbee Park

LPGA Championship and Women's British Open 
2003:  Annika Sörenstam
2011:  Yani Tseng
2015:  Inbee Park

U.S. Women's Open and Women's British Open 
Never has occurred

ANA Inspiration and du Maurier Classic 
1984:  Juli Inkster
1986:  Pat Bradley

LPGA Championship and du Maurier Classic 
1986:  Pat Bradley
1996:  Laura Davies

U.S. Women's Open and du Maurier Classic 
Never occurred

Women's Western Open and LPGA Championship 
1959:  Betsy Rawls
1963:  Mickey Wright
1967:  Kathy Whitworth

Women's Western Open and U.S. Women's Open 
1949:  Louise Suggs
1950:  Babe Zaharias

Women's Western Open and Titleholders Championship 
1946:  Louise Suggs
1948:  Patty Berg
1950:  Babe Zaharias
1955:  Patty Berg
1957:  Patty Berg
1962:  Mickey Wright

LPGA Championship and Titleholders Championship 
1961:  Mickey Wright

U.S. Women's Open and Titleholders Championship 
1950:  Babe Zaharias
1961:  Mickey Wright

Record scores
The lowest score in relation to par recorded in a women's major championship was 21-under-par, by Chun In-gee at the 2016 Evian Championship. Chun also holds the record for lowest aggregate score for 72-holes, at 263, for her performance at that tournament. The single round scoring record is 61 held by three golfers, Kim Hyo-joo at the 2014 Evian Championship, Lee Jeong-eun and Leona Maguire, both at 2021 Evian Championship. A score of 62 has been shot by Minea Blomqvist at the 2004 Women's British Open (third round), Lorena Ochoa at the 2006 Kraft Nabisco Championship (first round), and Mirim Lee at the 2016 Women's British Open (first round).

Rolex Annika Major Award
In 2014, the LPGA established the yearly Rolex Annika Major Award to recognize the overall best performance in the LPGA majors. Points are award for top-10 finishes in each major: 60 points for first place, 24 for second, down to 2 points for tenth place. The major winner with the most points at the end of the season wins the award. It is named after Annika Sörenstam.

Other regular tours
In men's (non-senior) golf, the four majors are agreed globally. All the principal tours acknowledge the status of the majors via their sponsorship of the Official World Golf Ranking, and the prize money is official on the three richest regular tours (the PGA, European, and Japanese tours). This is not the case in women's golf, but the significance of this is limited, as the LPGA Tour is much more dominant in women's golf than the PGA Tour is in men's golf. For example, the BBC has been known to use the LPGA definition of women's majors without qualifying it. Also, before the Evian Masters was elevated to major status, the Ladies' Golf Union, the governing body for women's golf in the UK and Republic of Ireland and the organiser of the Women's British Open, stated on its official site that the Women's British Open is "the only Women's Major to be played outside the U.S."

The Ladies European Tour does not sanction any of the LPGA majors which are played in the United States, and only has two events which it designates as majors on its schedule, namely the Women's British Open and The Evian Championship (historically the Evian Masters), which is played in France. The Ladies European Tour had long tacitly acknowledged the dominance of the LPGA Tour by not scheduling any of its events to conflict with any of the LPGA majors played in the U.S., but that changed slightly in 2008 when the LET scheduled a tournament opposite the LPGA Championship. Also, while the LPGA Tour did not recognize the then-Evian Masters as a major until 2013, it began co-sanctioning the tournament as a regular tour event in 2000. Because it was played the week before the Women's British Open (except in 2012, when the latter event was moved to September to avoid conflict with the London Olympics), and the purse was (and remains) one of the largest on the LPGA Tour, virtually all top LPGA players played the Evian Masters before its elevation to major status. The Evian Championship has now moved to September. (During the 2006–08 period, its winner also received an automatic berth in the LPGA Tour Championship.)

The LPGA of Japan Tour, which is the second richest women's golf tour, has its own set of four majors: the World Ladies, the Japan Open, the JLPGA Championship and the JLPGA Tour Championship. However, these events attract little notice outside Japan, and to a lesser degree South Korea (since a number of Koreans now play on the Japan tour).

Symetra Tour
Since 2006, the Symetra Tour, the LPGA's developmental tour known through 2011 as the Futures Tour, has designated the Tate & Lyle Players Championship, an event which has been held since 1985, as a major championship. It was the Tour's first $100,000 purse.

Women's senior golf

The Legends of the LPGA Tour, originally the Women's Senior Golf Tour, played its first season in 2001. The U.S. Senior Women's Open and the Senior LPGA Championship are considered to constitute the senior women's major golf championships.

The U.S. Senior Women's Open was established in 2018 and is open to women whose 50th birthday falls on or before the first day of competition. The eligibility for the Senior LPGA Championship, established in 2017, and the Legends of the LPGA Tour are for female golfers age 45 and older.

See also
Chronological list of LPGA major golf champions

Notes and references

 

no:Major-turnering